Sheffield is a civil parish in Sunbury County, New Brunswick, Canada.

For governance purposes it forms the local service district of the parish of Sheffield, which is a member of Regional Service Commission 11 (RSC11).

Origin of name
The parish was named for Baron Sheffield, notable as a friend of the province.

History
Sheffield was erected in 1786 as one of Sunbury County's original parishes; it extended twenty-five miles inland and included part of Northfield Parish.

In 1850 Sheffield was extended to the county line, adding unassigned territory to its rear.

In 1855 the parish was split into two polling districts, Eastern and Western. The boundary ran along the modern parish line with Northfield.

In 1857 the Eastern District was erected as Northfield Parish.

Boundaries
Sheffield Parish is bounded:

 on the northeast by a line beginning on the Maugerville Parish line about 300 metres northwesterly of the mouth of Barton Brook, then running south-southwesterly along the prolongation of the eastern line of a grant to S. B. Corey on the northern side of Route 10 in New Zion, passing about 500 metres west of Colwell Street, to strike the Queens County line about 2 kilometres southwesterly of the Minto Dump Road;
 on the southeast by the Queens County line;
 on the south by the Saint John River;
 on the northwest by the southeastern line of a grant to Nathaniel Underhill and D. Palmer Jr. on the Saint John River, about 225 metres upstream of the foot of Middle Island, then northeasterly along its prolongation to the starting point;
 including Middle Island in the Saint John River.

Communities
Communities at least partly within the parish.

  Albrights Corner
 Fernmount
 Lakeville Corner
 Maquapit Lake
 McGowans Corner
 Randall Corner
  Ripples
 Scale
  Sheffield

Bodies of water
Bodies of water at least partly within the parish.

 Little River
  Saint John River
 Sheffield Channel
 Baltimore Stream
 Portobello Stream
 Bridges Creek
 Loders Creek
 Otter Creek
 Portobello Reach
 Brownhouse Lead
 Coldspring Lead
 Palmer Lead
 Blind Thoroughfare
 Main Thoroughfare
 The Blobs
 The Narrows
 Cowperthwaite Lake
 French Lake
 Indian Lake
 Maquapit Lake
 Upper Timber Lake

Islands
Islands at least partly within the parish.

 Apple Island
 Butternut Island
 French Island
 Fulton Island
 Gull Island
 Harrison Island
 Indian Island
 Middle Island
 Princes Island

Other notable places
Parks, historic sites, and other noteworthy places at least partly within the parish.
 Burpee Wildlife Management Area
 Grand Lake Protected Natural Area

Demographics

Population
Population trend

Language
Mother tongue (2016)

Access Routes
Highways and numbered routes that run through the parish, including external routes that start or finish at the parish limits:

Highways

Principal Routes

Secondary Routes:

External Routes:
None

See also
List of parishes in New Brunswick

Notes

References

Parishes of Sunbury County, New Brunswick